The 1960 Utah State Aggies football team was an American football team that represented Utah State University in the Skyline Conference (Skyline) during the 1960 NCAA University Division football season. In their second season under head coach John Ralston, the Aggies compiled a 9–2 record (6–1 against Skyline opponents), tied for the Skyline championship, and outscored opponents by a total of 274 to 85.

Schedule

References

Utah State
Utah State Aggies football seasons
Mountain States Conference football champion seasons
Utah State Aggies football